Doug Dubitsky (born November 16, 1962) is an American politician who has served in the Connecticut House of Representatives from the 47th district since 2015.

References

1962 births
Living people
Republican Party members of the Connecticut House of Representatives
21st-century American politicians